Stephen L. Burns is an American science fiction and fantasy author. In short fiction he is most associated with the magazine  Analog Science Fiction and Fact and has won their "Anlab" readers poll four times. He has also won the Compton Crook Award and in 2000 was nominated for the Philip K. Dick Award.

Bibliography

Novels
 Flesh and Silver (1999)
 Call from a Distant Shore (2000)

Short stories
 "Taking Heart" (1984)
 "A Touch Beyond" (1985)
 "The Man of Peace" (1985)
 "Redeemer's Riddle" (1987)
 "In the Kingdom at Morning" (1987)
 "The Reading Lesson" (1988)
 "Pleased to Meat You" (1988)
 "The Arrow's Flight" (1989)
 "The Nearly Infinite Possibilities of Junk" (1989)
 "The Bridge Over Darikill Fel" (1990)
 "Angel" (1990)
 "A Roll of Round Dice" (1991)
 "Tranquillity Rose" (1992)
 "Green Fuse" (1992)
 "Leap" (1993)
 "White Room" (1993)
 "Showdown at Hell Creek" (1993)
 "Song from a Broken Instrument" (1994)
 "Down Under Crater Billy" (1995)
 "Capra's Keyhole" (1995)
 "Alexandrian Librarians" (1996)
 "The Wait" (1997)
 "Pitstop" (1997)
 "Masks of Flesh and Brass" (1998)
 "Roll Over Vivaldi" (1998)
 "The Coverture Incident" (1998)
 "Vultures" (1999)
 "You May Already Be a Winner" (1999)
 "Soapbox Cop Blues" (2000)
 "Night Voices" (2000)
 "Eden Tag" (2000)
 "Going, Going, Gone" (2001)
 "Look Away" (2002)
 "Green Light, Red Light" (2002)
 "Capture Radius" (2003)
 "Short Line Loco" (2004)
 "Smiling Faces in Hog Heaven" (2005)
 "Nothing to Fear But" (2006)
 "The Face of Hate" (2007)
 "Righteous Bite" (2008)
 "The Fourth Thing" (2008)
 
 
 
"Pandora's Pantry". Analog. 138 (11 & 12): 42-55. Nov/Dec 2018.

References

External links 
Stephen L. Burns's website

Living people
20th-century American novelists
American fantasy writers
Place of birth missing (living people)
Year of birth missing (living people)
American male novelists
American science fiction writers
American male short story writers
20th-century American short story writers
20th-century American male writers